Großriedenthal is a municipality in the district of Tulln in Lower Austria, Austria. The community consists of 3 districts: Großriedenthal (483 inhabitants), Ottenthal (364 inhabitants), and Neudegg (237 inhabitants). 
The mild climate and fertile soil allow the region to produce both fruity and full-bodied wines.
Grossriedenthal is in the wine district of Lower Austria about 50 km northwest of Vienna which is around one hour by car.

There are many botanical species native to the area that are not found anywhere else.

Population

References

External links

 In German - Official Homepage
 In German - More information

Cities and towns in Tulln District
Cadastral community of Tulln District